The following lists events that happened during 1979 in Zimbabwe-Rhodesia.

Incumbents
 President: Josiah Zion Gumede (starting 1 June and ending 12 December)
 Prime Minister: Abel Muzorewa (starting 1 June and ending 12 December)

Events
12 February - Air Rhodesia Flight 827 was shot down by guerillas, killing 59.
1 June - Rhodesia becomes Zimbabwe Rhodesia as an interim state.
12 December - In line with the terms of the Lancaster House Agreement, Zimbabwe Rhodesia formally returns to colonial status as the "British Dependency of Southern Rhodesia".

Births
 August 20 — Mandy Leach, freestyle swimmer

See also

1978 in Rhodesia
other events of 1979
1980 in Zimbabwe
Years in Zimbabwe

Years of the 20th century in Zimbabwe
Zimbabwe
 
Zim